The CMLL Universal Championship 2010 (Campeonato Universal in Spanish) was a professional wrestling annual tournament produced by Consejo Mundial de Lucha Libre (CMLL) took take place over three CMLL Super Viernes shows between July 30, 2010 and August 13, 2010 in Arena México, Mexico City, Mexico. The CMLL Universal Championship is an annual tournament of CMLL Champions that was first held in 2009. All officially recognized male CMLL Champions participated in a 16-man tournament. In the finals CMLL World Middleweight Champion Jushin Thunder Liger defeated CMLL World Trios Champion La Sombra to win the tournament.

Background
The tournament featured 15 professional wrestling matches under elimination rules, which means that wrestlers were eliminated when they lose a match. There were no specific storylines that build to the tournament, rather is an annual tournament held by CMLL since 2009, replacing their Leyenda de Plata tournament. All male "non-regional" CMLL Champions at the time of the tournament were involved in the tournament with the exception of the reigning CMLL World Mini-Estrella and Mexican National Lightweight Champions. Regionally promoted championships such as the CMLL Arena Coliseo Tag Team Championship and the Occidente championships promoted in Guadalajara, Jalisco were not included in the tournament, only titles that have been defended in CMLL's main venue Arena Mexico were included. The tournament was divided into two qualifying blocks, which took take place on the July 30, 2010 Super Viernes and the August 6, 2010 Super Viernes while the final took place on the August 13, 2010 Super Viernes.

2010 Universal Championship tournament
When CMLL announced the 2010 tournament the following champions were eligible to participate:

Block A
Block A took place on the July 30, 2010 Super Viernes, featuring eight champions wrestling for a place in the final.

Block B
Block B took place on the August 6, 2010 Super Viernes, featuring eight champions wrestling for a place in the final.

Finals
The finals of the tournament took place on the August 13, 2010 Super Viernes and saw Jushin Thunder Liger defeat La Sombra two falls to one, after interference from Liger's cornerman Okumura.

References

2010 in professional wrestling
CMLL Universal Championship